Helge Julius Jakhelln Dyvik (born December 23, 1947) is a Norwegian linguistics professor.

Dyvik was born in Bodø. After receiving a master's degree from the University of Bergen in 1972, he studied Old English and Middle English at Durham University in 1973, and then in 1976 received a master's degree in Nordic languages from the University of Bergen, where he also received his doctorate in 1983 with a dissertation in theoretical linguistics titled Grammatikk og empiri: en syntaktisk modell og dens forutsetninger (Grammar and Empiricism: A Syntactic Model and its Assumptions). In 1987 he received the Fridtjof Nansen Award for Excellence. He has worked at the University of Bergen's Department of Linguistics, Literary, and Aesthetic Studies as a professor of general linguistics since 1983. He became a member of the Royal Norwegian Society of Sciences and Letters in 1995, and the Norwegian Academy of Science and Letters in 1998. He has held various positions, including president of the Nordic Association of Linguists. He joined the Language Council of Norway in 2000.

References

External links
Helge Dyvik home page  
BIBSYS: Publications by Helge Dyvik

1947 births
Living people
People from Bodø
Linguists from Norway
Academic staff of the University of Bergen
Members of the Norwegian Academy of Science and Letters
Royal Norwegian Society of Sciences and Letters
Alumni of Durham University